Georg Wilhelm, Prince of Schaumburg-Lippe (20 December 1784 – 21 November 1860) was a Count and later Prince of Schaumburg-Lippe.

Biography
He was born in Bückeburg the son of Philipp II, Count of Schaumburg-Lippe, and his second wife Princess Juliane of Hesse-Philippsthal (1761–1799).

He succeeded his father as Count of Schaumburg-Lippe on 13 February 1787, but due to his age his mother Princess Juliane acted as regent. However Landgrave William IX of Hesse-Kassel (or Hesse-Cassel) occupied all of Schaumburg-Lippe except for Wilhelmstein, after invading it to enforce his claim to Schaumburg-Lippe based on Princess Juliane's supposed morganatic ancestry. The Imperial Court in Vienna however ruled in favour of Georg Wilhelm and ordered Landgrave William IX to withdraw, which he did after a two-month occupation.

Schaumburg-Lippe joined the Confederation of the Rhine on 15 December 1807 and was raised to a principality: Georg Wilhelm became the first Prince of Schaumburg-Lippe. In 1815 Schaumburg-Lippe joined the German Confederation. Georg Wilhelm died at Bückeburg and was succeeded as Prince by his son Adolf.

Marriage and children
Georg Wilhelm was married on 23 June 1816 at Arolsen to Princess Ida of Waldeck and Pyrmont (1796–1869); they had nine children:

Prince Adolf I (1817–1893)
Princess Mathilde (1818–1891); married 1843 Duke Eugen of Württemberg
Princess Adelheid (1821–1899); married 1841 Friedrich, Duke of Schleswig-Holstein-Sonderburg-Glücksburg
Prince Ernst (1822–1831)
Princess Ida (1824–1894)
Princess Emma (1827–1828)
Prince William (1834–1906); married 1862 Princess Bathildis of Anhalt-Dessau 
Prince Hermann (1839–1839)
Princess Elisabeth (1841–1926); married 1866 (and divorced 1868) Prince Wilhelm of Hanau and Horowitz, a morganatic son of Frederick William, Elector of Hesse.

References 

 Otto Preuß: Georg Wilhelm, Fürst zu Schaumburg-Lippe. In: Allgemeine Deutsche Biographie (ADB). Band 8, Duncker & Humblot, Leipzig 1878, p. 688 f.

External links
 Schaumburg-Lippe

 

1784 births
1860 deaths
People from Bückeburg
House of Lippe
Princes of Schaumburg-Lippe
People from Schaumburg-Lippe